Events in 2017 in anime. This year is known as the Anime Centennial Year, and was celebrated as its 100th anniversary to commemorate the ending of the Heisei era.

Awards 

 1st Crunchyroll Anime Awards
 11th Seiyu Awards

Releases

Films
A list of anime that debuted in theaters between 1 January and 31 December 2017.

ONAs/OVAs

Television series
A list of anime television series that debuted between 1 January and 31 December 2017.

Highest-grossing films
The following are the 10 highest-grossing anime films of 2017.

Notes

References

External links 
Japanese animated works of the year, listed in the IMDb

Years in anime
anime
anime